Ophtalmibidion auba is a species of beetle in the family Cerambycidae. It was described by Martins and Galileo in 1999.

References

Neoibidionini
Beetles described in 1999